Persistent genital arousal disorder (PGAD), previously called persistent sexual arousal syndrome, is spontaneous, persistent, unwanted and uncontrollable genital arousal in the absence of sexual stimulation or sexual desire, and is typically not relieved by orgasm. Instead, multiple orgasms over hours or days may be required for relief.

PGAD occurs in women. It has been compared to priapism in men. PGAD is rare and is not well understood. The literature is inconsistent with the nomenclature. It is distinguished from hypersexuality, which is characterized as heightened sexual desire.

Classification
In 2003, "persistent genital arousal" was considered for inclusion with regard to the International Consultation on Sexual Medicine (ICSM). In 2009, "persistent genital arousal dysfunction" was included in its third edition. PGAD is not included in the Diagnostic and Statistical Manual of Mental Disorders (DSM-5) or the International Classification of Diseases (ICD-10), which may be due to the disorder requiring further research.

The condition has been characterized by a researcher as being a term with no scientific basis. There is concern that the title may be misleading because, since the genital arousal is unwanted, it is dubious to characterize it as arousal.

Other researchers have suggested that the disorder be renamed "persistent genital vasocongestion disorder (PGVD)" or "restless genital syndrome (ReGS)."

Signs and symptoms
Physical arousal caused by PGAD can be very intense and persist for extended periods, days or weeks at a time. Symptoms include pressure, pain, irritation, clitoral tingling, throbbing, vaginal congestion, vaginal contractions, and sometimes spontaneous orgasms. Pressure, discomfort, pounding, pulsating, throbbing or engorgement may include the clitoris, labia, vagina, perineum, or the anus. The symptoms may result from sexual activity or from no identified stimulus, and are not relieved by orgasm except for cases where multiple orgasms over hours or days allow for relief.  The symptoms can impede on home or work life.  Women may feel embarrassment or shame, and avoid sexual relationships, because of the disorder. Stress can make the symptoms worse.

Cause
Researchers do not know the cause of PGAD, but assume that it has neurological, vascular, pharmacological, and psychological causes. Tarlov cysts have been speculated as a cause. PGAD has been associated with clitoral priapism, and has been compared to priapism in men. It is also similar to vulvodynia, in that the causes for both are not well understood, both last for a long time, and women with either condition may be told that it is psychological rather than physical. It has been additionally associated with restless legs syndrome (RLS), but a minority of women with PGAD have restless legs syndrome.

In some recorded cases, the syndrome was caused by or can cause a pelvic arterial-venous malformation with arterial branches to the  clitoris. Surgical treatment was effective in this instance. There is evidence that some drugs such as SSRIs and SNRIs might induce or worsen PGAD.

Diagnosis
The following five criteria must be met by patients in order to be diagnosed with PGAD:

 Typical physiological responses from sexual arousal persist for an extended amount of time and do not cease on their own
 Feelings of arousal remain even after orgasm or multiple orgasms are needed to lessen the arousal
 Arousal is experienced without desire or sexual excitement
 Arousal occurs with both sexual and non-sexual stimuli or with no stimuli
 Symptoms are intrusive, unwanted, and cause distress

Treatment
Because PGAD has only been researched since 2001, there is little documenting what may cure or remedy the disorder. Treatment may include extensive psychotherapy, psycho-education, and pelvic floor physical therapy. In one case, serendipitous relief of symptoms was concluded from treatment with varenicline, a treatment for nicotine addiction. It was reported in a study that masturbation (51%), orgasm (50%), distraction (39%), intercourse (36%), exercise (25%), and cold compresses (13%) were the most relieving treatments that could be done without the help of a professional.

Having a team of professionals such as a medical provider, a pelvic floor physical therapist, and sex therapist has shown to aid patients. One study found that after working with professionals patients felt validated, listened to, and that their sexual function had improved. Many patients felt practicing mindfulness allowed them to adjust to living with PGAD by recognizing thoughts and emotions corresponding to the symptoms and avoiding brooding over them. This treatment method focuses on reducing the anxiety that is caused by the condition and pushes the patient to develop effective distraction and relaxation techniques.

Epidemiology
PGAD is very rare and is believed to affect about 1% of women. Although online surveys have indicated that hundreds of women may have PGAD, documented case studies have been limited to about 22.

History
The earliest references to PGAD may be Greek descriptions of hypersexuality (previously known as "satyriasis" and "nymphomania"), which confused persistent genital arousal with sexual insatiability. While PGAD involves the absence of sexual desire, hypersexuality is characterized as heightened sexual desire.

The term persistent sexual arousal syndrome was coined by researchers Leiblum and Nathan in 2001. In 2006, Leiblum renamed the condition to "persistent genital arousal disorder" to indicate that genital arousal sensations are different from those that result from true sexual arousal. The rename was also considered to give the condition a better chance of being classified as a dysfunction.

Impact on mental health 
Women with PGAD report having unstable mental health with thoughts of suicide and difficulty completing daily activities. Before the start of their PGAD, many women were seen to have higher stress scores as well as symptoms of depression and anxiety. Panic attacks (31.6%) and major depression (57.9%) were reported commonalities between patients occurring at least one year prior to the onset of PGAD symptoms. Up to 45% of women with the disorder have reported having a history with antidepressants.

A small study found that several women began to see symptoms of PGAD after discontinuing the use of their selective serotonin reuptake inhibitors. It is not known whether reintroduction of the SSRIs would improve PGAD symptoms.

Relevant conditions 
Post SSRI Sexual Dysfunction (PSSD), a condition which sufferers have opposite difficulties compared to PGAD for instance inability to be aroused after discontinuation of SSRI/SNRI.

See also

 Vaginismus

References

External links
 PSAS, information about PSAS in Dutch and English
 A Hundred Orgasms A Day, Channel 5 (UK) 2004 documentary film about PSAS
 Car crash leaves woman constantly aroused, Ninemsn, 16 December 2009

Noninflammatory disorders of female genital tract
Gynaecologic disorders
Sexual arousal
Sexual disorders
Syndromes
Clitoris
Priapism